The US state Vermont has many symbols, some officially codified by legislation (mineral, flower, bird, beverage, pie, mammal, song, insect, tree, and fish), and several unofficial symbols. These unofficial symbols of Vermont include: maple syrup; the eastern white pine (Pinus strobus), which was worn as a badge by the Green Mountain Boys and appears on the Vermont coat of arms and Vermont Military Crest; and the white-tailed deer (Odocoileus virginianus), which also appears on the state's coat of arms. The number 14 figures prominentally in the state's history and lore. The Vermont Republic lasted for fourteen years, the pine tree on the Great Seal of Vermont has fourteen branches, the state has fourteen counties, and Vermont was the fourteenth state in the Union.

Vermont's state song is "These Green Mountains", composed by Diane Martin and arranged by Rita Buglass Gluck. This song was officially designated as the state song on 22 May 2000. This song replaced "Hail to Vermont!", which was written by Josephine Hovey-Perry and made the state song in 1938. However, "Moonlight in Vermont" remains an unofficial favorite.

The state bird is the hermit thrush (Catharus guttatus). This was adopted in 1941. The bird was only designated after debate in the legislature; though the hermit thrush is found in all of 14 counties and has a distinctive sweet call, it leaves the state during the winter for its yearly southward migration. Many legislators favored the blue jay (Cyanocitta cristata).

The red clover (Trifolium pratense) was designated as the state flower by the Vermont General Assembly in 1895. The red clover is often seen in the countryside of Vermont hosting the state insect – the western honey bee (Apis mellifera), designated by Act 124 of the 1978 biennial session of the Vermont General Assembly. A natural companion and frequent visitor to the state flower, the honey bee was chosen for its agricultural benefits, and for being a "social" insect and representing the unity side of Vermont's state motto Freedom and Unity.

Vermont named two official state fish by Joint Resolution of the Vermont General Assembly in 1978 and statute in 2011: the cold-water fish, the brook trout (Salvelinus fontinalis) and the warm-water fish, the walleye (Sander vitreous vitreous).

The state tree is the sugar maple (Acer saccharum), effective in 1949. The sugar maple is the source of maple syrup, Vermont's most famous export.

The Morgan horse became the state mammal in 1961. The Morgan horse is a horse breed originally from Vermont, and named for Justin Morgan. The state maintains standards and develops bloodlines for the breed at the University of Vermont's Morgan Horse Farm at Weybridge.

The state amphibian, adopted by the legislature in 1997, is the northern leopard frog (Rana pipiens).

Vermont has also designated an official state mineral (talc), pie (apple pie), soil ("Tunbridge Soil Series"), beverage (milk), gem (grossular garnet), and fossil (the beluga skeleton at the University of Vermont's Perkins Geology Museum).

The state reptile is the painted turtle. The state rocks are granite, marble, and slate.

Vermont is distinct for being among only three U.S. states with both a state seal and a coat of arms. Vermont is the only U.S. state to have a heraldically correct blazon describing its coat of arms.

See also
List of Vermont-related topics
Lists of United States state insignia
State of Vermont

References

External links
The Department of Libraries web page on Vermont emblems, facts and figures
The Office of the Secretary of State of Vermont's kids' web page on Vermont symbols
The Vermont Statutes Online, Title 1: General Provisions, Chapter 11: Flag, Insignia, Seal, Etc.

State symbols
Vermont